Mathon may refer to:

Places 
 Mathon, Herefordshire, England
 Mathon, Switzerland

People 
 Alice Téligny Mathon (fl. 1920s–1930s), Haitian feminist
 Claire Mathon (born 1975), French cinematographer

See also